Kirill Samusenko (born 8 May 1992) is a Russian male track cyclist, representing Russia at international competitions. He competed at the 2016 UEC European Track Championships in the team sprint event.

References

1992 births
Living people
Russian male cyclists
Russian track cyclists
Place of birth missing (living people)
21st-century Russian people